This article lists important figures and events in Malayan public affairs during the year 1954, as well as births and deaths of significant Malayans.

Incumbent political figures

Central level 
 Governor of Malaya :
 Gerald Templer (until 31 May)
 Donald Charles MacGillivray (from 31 May)
 Chief Minister Federation of Malaya :
 Tunku Abdul Rahman Putra Al-Haj

State level
  Perlis :
 Raja of Perlis : Syed Harun Putra Jamalullail 
 Menteri Besar of Perlis : Raja Ahmad Raja Endut
  Johore :
 Sultan of Johor : Sultan Ibrahim Al-Masyhur
 Menteri Besar of Johor : Syed Abdul Kadir Mohamed 
  Kedah :
 Sultan of Kedah : Sultan Badlishah
 Menteri Besar of Kedah : 
 Mohamad Sheriff Osman (until January)
 Tunku Ismail Tunku Yahya (from January)
  Kelantan :
 Sultan of Kelantan : Sultan Ibrahim
 Menteri Besar of Kelantan : Tengku Muhammad Hamzah Raja Muda Long Zainal Abidin
  Trengganu :
 Sultan of Trengganu : Sultan Ismail Nasiruddin Shah
 Menteri Besar of Terengganu : Raja Kamaruddin Idris
  Selangor :
 Sultan of Selangor : Sultan Sir Hishamuddin Alam Shah Al-Haj 
 Menteri Besar of Selangor :
 Othman Mohamad (until September)
 Raja Uda Raja Muhammad (from September)
  Penang :
 Monarchs : Queen Elizabeth II
 Residents-Commissioner : Robert Porter Bingham
  Malacca :
 Monarchs : Queen Elizabeth II
 Residents-Commissioner : Maurice John Hawyard (Acting)
  Negri Sembilan :
 Yang di-Pertuan Besar of Negeri Sembilan : Tuanku Abdul Rahman ibni Almarhum Tuanku Muhammad 
 Menteri Besar Negeri Sembilan : Shamsuddin Naim
  Pahang :
 Sultan of Pahang : Sultan Abu Bakar
 Menteri Besar of Pahang : Tengku Mohamad Sultan Ahmad 
  Perak :
 British Adviser of Perak : Ian Blelloch
 Sultan of Perak : Sultan Yusuf Izzuddin Shah
 Menteri Besar of Perak : Abdul Wahab Toh Muda Abdul Aziz

Events
 February – Parti Negara formed by Dato' Onn Jaafar.
6 March – Port Dickson and Rembau in Negeri Sembilan are declared White Areas.
3 April – Town councils election is held in Pasir Mas, Kelantan.
1 May – Film Censorship Board of Malaysia is established as Malayan Censorship Board.
May – Bourne School, Kuala Lumpur is established.
 1 May - 9 May – Malaya competed for the first time in the 1954 Asian Games held in Manila, Philippines with 9 competitors in 1 sport.
 3 July – Town councils election in Kota Bharu, Kelantan.
 8 July – Operation Termite.
 21 July – Town councils election is held in Kuantan, Pahang.
 11 August – Institut Pendidikan Guru Malaysia Kampus Kota Bharu is established as Maktab Penguruan Kota Bharu.
 15 August – Town councils election is held in Ipoh-Menglembu, Taiping and Teluk Anson in Perak.
 10 October – Johore state election.
 29 October – Trengganu state election.
 6 November – Town councils election is held in Segamat, Johor.
 4 December – Local municipal election is held in George Town, Kuala Lumpur and Malacca.
 4 December – Town councils election is held in Bukit Mertajam and Butterworth, Penang; Muar, Bandar Penggaram, Johor Baharu, Kluang in Johor; Klang, Selangor; and Seremban, Negeri Sembilan.
 Unknown date – Hang Tuah Stadium completed and officially opened.
 Unknown date – SMK Pendidikan Khas Persekutuan is established as Federation School for the Deaf. Its become first school deaf in Malaya.
 Unknown date – Election Offences Act 1954 is enforced.

Births 
 18 February – Jalaluddin Hassan – Actor
 24 April – Yusof Haslam – Film director and actor
 29 April – M. Kayveas – Politician
 15 May – Mohamed Nazri Abdul Aziz – Politician
 25 May – Sudirman Arshad – Singer (died 1992)
 14 June – Zulkifeli Mohd. Zin – Commander of Angkatan Tentera Malaysia
 14 October – Mohamad Sabu – Politician

Deaths

See also
 1954 
 1953 in Malaya | 1955 in Malaya
 History of Malaysia

References

 
Years of the 20th century in Malaysia
Malaya
Malaya
Malaya